Rodney Laurence Ferguson II (born August 25, 1986) is a former American football running back. He was signed by the Tennessee Titans as an undrafted free agent in 2009. He played college football at New Mexico.

College career
Ferguson graduated from Manzano High School in Albuquerque in 2004 and enrolled at the University of New Mexico that year. Playing as a backup to DonTrell Moore, Ferguson gained 48 yards on 11 carries in his first season with the Lobos. The following season, Ferguson ran for a career-high 1,234 yards with 7 touchdowns en route to a first team all Mountain West Conference selection. In his third season at UNM, Ferguson ran for 1,177 yards and 13 touchdowns, which again led to his selection to the first team all-MWC team. 2008 was his 4th and final year at New Mexico. During the season Ferguson rushed for 1,105 yards and 13 touchdowns, but the Lobos finished with a 4-8 record in which they lost 5 of the final 6 games and did not make a bowl game. He was also a team captain in 2008.

Professional career

Tennessee Titans
After going undrafted in the 2009 NFL Draft, Ferguson was signed by the Tennessee Titans on April 26, 2009. He was waived during final roster cuts on September 4, 2009, and signed to the team's practice squad two days later. He was released on September 29, 2009.

Buffalo Bills
Ferguson was signed by the Buffalo Bills on April 12, 2010. He was waived during final roster cuts on September 4, 2010, and signed to the team's practice squad the next day. He was released on November 9, 2010.

References

Further reading

1986 births
Living people
American football running backs
New Mexico Lobos football players
Players of American football from Flint, Michigan
Players of American football from Albuquerque, New Mexico